Fiona Docherty (born 1975) is a multi-sport athlete and runner from New Zealand.

Life
Docherty and her brother Bevan grew up in Taupo, in the North Island of New Zealand and attended Tauhara College. Their father Ray was a keen triathlete and their mother, Irene, and their children trained and competed with him. 

Docherty competed in international triathlons and duathlons from 2002 to 2007. One of her most successful races was her first attempt at the Powerman Zofingen long distance duathlon in Switzerland in 2003, which she won.

In 2007, she was diagnosed with piriformis syndrome and underwent medical treatment. On recovery in late 2008, she decided to focus on running, and in 2010 she decided to target marathon running.

References

1975 births
Living people
New Zealand female triathletes
Sportspeople from Taupō
People educated at Tauhara College
20th-century New Zealand women
21st-century New Zealand women